The 1992–93 NCAA football bowl games were a series of post-season games played in December 1992 and January 1993 to end the 1992 NCAA Division I-A football season. A total of 18 team-competitive games, and two all-star games, were played. The post-season began with the Las Vegas Bowl on December 18, 1992, and concluded on January 16, 1993, with the season-ending Senior Bowl.

Schedule

References